Vadym Viktorovych Semchuk (born 24 November 1993) is a Ukrainian professional footballer who plays as a right winger for German club FV Engers 07.

References

External links
 
 
 

1993 births
Living people
Footballers from Zhytomyr
Ukrainian footballers
Association football forwards
FC Karpaty Lviv players
FC Poltava players
Chełmianka Chełm players
FC Arsenal Kyiv players
FC Polissya Zhytomyr players
FC Karpaty Halych players
FC Olimpik Donetsk players
FC Nyva Vinnytsia players
Ukrainian Premier League players
Ukrainian First League players
Ukrainian Second League players
III liga players
Ukrainian expatriate footballers
Expatriate footballers in Poland
Ukrainian expatriate sportspeople in Poland
Expatriate footballers in Germany
Ukrainian expatriate sportspeople in Germany
Sportspeople from Zhytomyr Oblast